Taneda (written: 種田) is a Japanese surname. Notable people with the surname include:

 (born 1986), Japanese swimmer
 (born 1988), Japanese voice actress
, Japanese musician
 (1882–1940), pen-name of Taneda Shōichi, Japanese writer and poet

See also
Pizzo Taneda, mountain in the Swiss Alps

Japanese-language surnames